Dirty Weekend is a 2015 comedy-drama film written and directed by Neil LaBute and starring Matthew Broderick, Alice Eve, and Phil Burke. Produced by Duncan Montgomery, Tiller Russell, and Joey Stewart, with Executive Producers Cody Davis, Jack Selby & James Jackson Leach. Shot in Albuquerque, New Mexico.

Plot
Les Moore (Broderick) is a businessman who finds himself delayed in a city where a year earlier a few too many drinks led to an unexpected encounter that has since haunted him. He sets out with his co-worker Natalie Hamilton (Eve) to figure out what really happened.

Cast
 Matthew Broderick as Les Moore
 Alice Eve as Natalie Hamilton
 Phil Burke as Cabbie
 Gia Crovatin as Dylan Price

Production
Duncan Montgomery, Tiller Russell, and Joey Stewart produced the film while Neil LaBute directed and wrote the script. In November 2013, K5 International signed on to distribute world wide.

Executive Produced by Cody Davis, Jack Selby & James Jackson Leach.

Filming took place in Albuquerque, New Mexico in fall 2013.

Reception
Critical response aggregator Rotten Tomatoes gave the film a 27% approval rating based on 26 reviews, with an average rating of 4.25/10. Metacritic reports a score of 39/100 based on 16 critics, indicating "generally unfavorable reviews".

References

External links
 

Films directed by Neil LaBute
Films shot in New Mexico
2015 comedy-drama films
2015 films
Midlife crisis films
American comedy-drama films
2010s English-language films
2010s American films